Taraxacum lissocarpum is a species of flowering plant belonging to the family Asteraceae.

References

lissocarpum